The 2013 Alabama State Hornets football team represented Alabama State University as a member of the East Division of the Southwestern Athletic Conference (SWAC) during 2013 NCAA Division I FCS football season. Led by seventh-year head coach Reggie Barlow, the Hornets compiled an overall record of 8–4 with a mark of 7–2 in conference play, tying for second place in the SWAC East Division. Alabama State played home games at New ASU Stadium in Montgomery, Alabama.

Alabama State entered the season with a new defensive coordinator, Kevin Ramsey, who joined the team from Texas Southern University. The Hornets were picked to win the SWAC Eastern Division, and seven players were selected for the SWAC Pre-Season All-Conference team.

Schedule

^Games aired on a tape delayed basis

References

Alabama State
Alabama State Hornets football seasons
Alabama State Hornets football